Thinkabout, "a cooperative project for acquiring skills essential to learning", is an instructional program for children, produced in 1979 by the Agency for Instructional Television, in association with various contributing television stations in the United States and Canada.  It was distributed to PBS and educational stations across the US and Canada as late as the mid-to-late 1980s. A sequel, Thinkabout II, followed.

The 60 programs produced were aimed for fifth and sixth grade students to understand their learning process in topics as varied as language arts, mathematics, study skills, as well as thinking skills.

Thinkabout was funded by various state and local agencies, including the Exxon Corporation, with additional support from the Corporation for Public Broadcasting, one of very few CPB-funded programs not distributed by PBS.

Program listing

1. Why Bother?
2. Brainstorming
3. Blockbusting
4. You Can Remember
5. Estimating
6. Approximating
7. Using Estimating and Approximation
8. Find Your Guide
9. What's the Meaning?
10. Meaning is More Than Words
11. Remember the Audience!
12. But, What Does it Mean?
13. The Biggest Picture
14. Where are You Coming From?
15. Make a Present for the Future
16. What Do You Know?
17. Where Should I Go?
18. What Should I Know?
19. There are Ways to Remember
20. Classfying Objects
21. Classfying Information
22. People
23. There are Many Ways to Go
24. People Patterns
25. Communication Patterns
26. Cultural Patterns
27. Nature's Patterns
28. Search for the Unknown
29. Drawing Conclusions
30. Checking Conclusions
31. Practice for Success
32. One Step at a Time
33. Plan Ahead
34. Calm Your Jitters!
35. What are They?
36. Where Do You Get Them?
37. How Do You Change That?
38. Design a Language
39. Symbols
40. More Than You Think
41. Summarizing
42. Using Maps and Models
43. Get Ahead with Goals
44. Should I Believe?
45. What's Important?
46. What's Enough?
47. Point of View
48. Persuasive Techniques
49. Make a Deal with Yourself
50. Styles of Communication
51. Planning a Presentation
52. Making a Presentation
53. Making Your Point
54. Making it Come Alive
55. Making Something New
56. One Thing Leads to Another
57. A Matter of Time
58. There's Always a Risk
59. Hanging in There
60. Plan a City of the Future

Trivia
 During the 1979-1980 school year, AIT partnered with Weekly Reader magazine, in which Weekly Reader included a special Thinkabout feature in their 4th and 5th grade editions.
 This series is unrelated to the 1980s BBC Two program of the same name, which was seen in the 1980s and 1990s; unlike the US series, the British series' focus was on science.

See also
 Inside/Out

External links
Thinkabout TVOntario fan page; includes episode guide

Yahoo Group: ietv -- instructional/educational media (registration required)

Television series by the Agency for Instructional Technology
1970s American children's television series
1970s Canadian children's television series
1980s American children's television series
1980s Canadian children's television series
1979 American television series debuts
1979 Canadian television series debuts
1980 American television series endings
1980 Canadian television series endings
American children's education television series
Canadian children's education television series
Personal development television series
First-run syndicated television programs in the United States